Alexis Zabé, AMC, ASC, (born June 4, 1970) is a Mexican cinematographer who studied at the Centro Universitario de Estudios Cinematográficos. He is best known for his work on films such as Silent Light and The Florida Project. Zabé is known to work frequently with directors Fernando Eimbcke and Carlos Reygadas. He is a member of both the Mexican Society of Cinematographers and the American Society of Cinematographers. Zabé is currently attached to several films including Erēmīta (Anthologies), directed by Sam Abbas.

Early life
As a teenager born in Mexico City, Zabé would go to local-second run theaters where they would run a different film every day. His father was a photographer so Zabé grew up around images and cameras. He believes his love for photography is "genetic" and that his incline towards cinematography is very natural. This natural love for photography and cinema led him to attend the Centro Universitario de Estudios Cinematográficos. While studying he met future director Fernando Eimbcke and the two became friends, having shot different short films together. After graduating, Zabé realized that Mexico's cinematic industry panorama was not promising since the country was going through a severe economic crisis that had an impact on the almost zero production of films in those years. Because of this, Zabé and the people of his same generation took refuge in other audiovisual aspects such as video clips, commercials and TV programs.

Filmography

References

External links
Alexis Zabe - IMDb
Alexis Zabe Biography
‘The Florida Project’ Cinematographer Alexis Zabe On Gorgeously-Realized ‘Little Rascals’ For The 21st Century
ASC Welcomes Alexis Zabé as a New Member
AMC 23.98fps - Revista bimestral

Living people
Mexican cinematographers
1964 births